Chekism (from Cheka, a colloquial name of the All-Russian Extraordinary Commission, the first Soviet secret police organization) is a term to describe the situation in the Soviet Union where the secret police strongly controlled all spheres of society. It is also used by critics of the current Kremlin authorities to describe the power enjoyed by law-enforcement agencies in contemporary Russia.

Soviet Union
Chekism is described as a product of the set of beliefs, practices, and assumptions in the security police introduced and developed for more than a decade by Felix Dzerzhinskii. The systems he had put in place led to the sacralization of the concept that legitimized and romanticized political terror. Abdurakhman Avtorkhanov put forward the idea of the secret political police as a backbone of Soviet society. Avtorkhanov wrote in his The Technology of Power (1959):

Others shared similar ideas, including journalist John Barron, retired KGB Major General Oleg Kalugin, and researcher on KGB subjects Evgenia Albats. Chekism evolved into some form of a cult that is based on the so-called virtues of the Cheka mentalite. According to Albats, most KGB leaders, including Lavrenty Beria, Yuri Andropov, and Vladimir Kryuchkov, have always struggled for power with the Communist Party and manipulated the ostensible communist leaders. The sacralization of chekism allowed leaders such as Dzerzhinskii to forge special relationship with the secret police members while promoting the otherness of the party founders.

Commenting on the Soviet regime of the early 1980s, Yegor Gaidar writes: "The authority of the regime was based on an effective secret police." Along with that, "since 1968, before the death of Brezhnev, no weapons were used to suppress the dissent. The regime has learned to do without extreme forms of violence".  According to the data provided by Gaidar, "In 1958–1966 people convicted for anti-Soviet agitation amounted to 3448. In 1967–1975, 1583 people were convicted. In 1971–1974, KGB "took care" of 63 thousand people. Potential dissidents must realize that their activities are known to the authorities and there's an alternative—to be jailed or to express loyalty to the authorities."

Contemporary Russia

According to former Russian Duma member Konstantin Borovoi, "Putin's appointment is the culmination of the KGB's crusade for power. This is its finale. Now the KGB runs the country." Olga Kryshtanovskaya, director of the Moscow-based Center for the Study of Elites, has found that up to 78% of 1,016 leading political figures in Russia have served previously in organizations affiliated with the KGB or FSB. She said: "If in the Soviet period and the first post-Soviet period, the KGB and FSB people were mainly involved in security issues, now half are still involved in security but the other half are involved in business, political parties, NGOs, regional governments, even culture... They started to use all political institutions."

The KGB or FSB members usually remain in the "acting reserve" even if they formally leave the organization ("acting reserve" members receive a second FSB salary, follow FSB instructions, and remain "above the law" being protected by the organization, according to Kryshtanovskaya). As Vladimir Putin said, "There is no such thing as a former KGB man". Soon after becoming prime minister of Russia, Putin also perhaps somewhat jokingly claimed that "A group of FSB colleagues dispatched to work undercover in the government has successfully completed its first mission." Moreover, the FSB has formal membership, military discipline, and an extensive network of civilian informants, hardcore ideology, and support of population (60% of Russians trust FSB), which according to Yevgenia Albats and Catherine A. Fitzpatrick makes it a perfect totalitarian political party.

Some observers note that the current Russian state security organization FSB is even more powerful than KGB was, because it does not operate under the control of the Communist Party as the KGB in the past. Moreover, the FSB leadership and their partners own the most important economic assets in the country and control the Russian government and the State Duma. According to Ion Mihai Pacepa,

However, the number of FSB staff is a state secret in Russia, and the staff of Russian Strategic Rocket Forces is not officially subordinate to the FSB, although FSB might be interested in monitoring these structures, as they inherently involve state secrets and various degrees of access to them. The Law on the Federal Security Service which defines the FSB's functions and establishes its structure does not specify such tasks as managing strategic branches of national industry, controlling political groups, or infiltrating the federal government.

A political scientist, Stanislav Belkovsky also defines Chekism to be an "imperial ideology" that includes aggressive anti-Americanism.

Andrei Illarionov, a former advisor of Vladimir Putin, describes contemporary Chekism as a new corporatism system, "distinct from any seen in our country before". In this model, members of the Corporation of Intelligence Service Collaborators [Russian abbreviation KSSS] took over the entire body of state power, follow an omerta-like behavior code, and "are given instruments conferring power over others – membership “perks”, such as the right to carry and use weapons". According to Illarionov, this "Corporation has seized key government agencies – the Tax Service, Ministry of Defense, Ministry of Foreign Affairs, Parliament, and the government-controlled mass media – which are now used to advance the interests of KSSS members. Through these agencies, every significant resource of the country – security/intelligence, political, economic, informational and financial – is being monopolized in the hands of Corporation members." The ideology of "Chekists" is "Nashism (“ours-ism”), the selective application of rights", he said.

Attitudes toward Chekism in contemporary Russia

Chekists perceive themselves as a ruling class, with political powers transferred from one generation to another. A source cited that chekism created "mafiocracy" in Russia since it is part of corruption and criminality from the outset. Criminals were able to use the Chekist machinery to expand its power. According to a former FSB general, "A Chekist is a breed. ... A good KGB heritage—a father or grandfather, say, who worked for the service—is highly valued by today's siloviki. Marriages between siloviki clans are also encouraged".

The head of the Russian Drug Enforcement Administration Viktor Cherkesov said that all Russian siloviks must act as a united front: "We [Chekists] must stay together. We did not rush to power, we did not wish to appropriate the role of the ruling class. But the history commanded so that the weight of sustaining the Russian statehood fell to the large extent on our shoulders... There were no alternatives". Cherkesov also emphasized the importance of Chekism as a "hook" that keeps the entire country from falling apart: "Falling into the abyss the post-Soviet society caught the Chekist hook. And hanged on it.”''

Political scientist Yevgenia Albats found such attitudes deplorable: "Throughout the country, without investigation or trial, the Chekists [of an earlier generation] raged. They tortured old men and raped schoolgirls and killed parents before the eyes of their children. They impaled people, beat them with an iron glove, put wet leather 'crowns' on their heads, buried them alive, locked them in cells where the floor was covered with corpses. Amazing, isn't it that today's agents do not blanch to call themselves Chekists, and proudly claim Dzerzhinsky's legacy?"

See also
Silovik
Counterintelligence state
Chronology of Soviet secret police agencies
Mitrokhin Archive (smuggled records of the KGB)
Federalnaya Sluzhba Bezopasnosti (a post-Soviet successor organization to the KGB)
Agents provocateurs
Agent of influence

Notes

References

Further reading
Russia: Death and resurrection of the KGB By J. Michael Waller, Demokratizatsiya: The Journal of Post-Soviet Democratization
A Rogue Intelligence State? Why Europe and America Cannot Ignore Russia By Reuel Marc Gerecht
 Putin's Russia, by Anna Politkovskaya

Soviet internal politics
Politics of Russia
Soviet intelligence agencies
Secret police